William McCarthy may refer to:

 William J. McCarthy (1919–1998), American labor leader and official in the Teamsters union
 William C. McCarthy (1820–1900), mayor of Pittsburgh, 1875–1878
 William T. McCarthy (1885–1964), U.S. federal judge
 William McCarthy, Baron McCarthy (1925–2012), British politician
 William McCarthy (baseball) (1882–1939), American baseball pitcher
 William McCarthy (basketball), former head basketball coach at Niagara University
 William McCarthy (director), American film director
 Bill McCarthy (baseball) (1886–1928), American baseball catcher
 Bill McCarthy (politician) (1923–1987), Australian politician
 Bill McCarthy (Australian rules footballer) (died 1940), played for Essendon, Fitzroy and Footscray 
 Bill McCarthy (NHS), Policy Director NHS England

See also
 William McCarty (disambiguation)